Arthur Goldschmidt may refer to:
 Arthur Goldschmidt Jr., historian of Egypt and professor of Middle East history
 Arthur E. Goldschmidt, American economist and diplomat